The Mossman Carriage Collection is a museum housing a collection of horse-drawn vehicles in Stockwood Park, Luton, Bedfordshire. It is the largest collection of such vehicles in the United Kingdom, and includes original vehicles dating from the 18th, 19th and 20th centuries.

Overview
The collection was donated to the Luton Museum Service in 1991 (now Stockwood Discovery Centre part of Luton Culture) and has examples of horse-drawn road vehicles and carriages used in Britain dating from Roman times up until the 1930s. The collection has examples of vehicles used by tradesmen and ordinary people as well as luxury vehicles and state coaches used by the British nobility and on the large British estates. 

The collection is significant to the people of Luton, Bedfordshire as it documents the life’s work and passions of a local man. It is also of national significance as the largest private collection of horse-drawn vehicles.

History
The collection was put together by George Mossman who was born in Luton in 1908. Shortly after the First World War, Mossman left school and started work for a local butcher, Panters, in Park Street, as a delivery driver. This was the beginning of Mossman's lifelong interest in horse-drawn transport.  

Mossman had a varied working life, running several businesses and a farm. He acquired a leasing company providing horse-drawn carriages for films and special events such as weddings, carnivals and public occasions. Mossman drove his carriages in London’s Lord Mayor's Show for 25 years and provided some carriages and drivers for Queen Elizabeth's coronation procession in 1953.
The museum houses 54 registered vehicles of Mossman's,  as well as carriages from the Luton Museum Services collection. In total there are more than 63 vehicles on display, including original carriages from the 18th to the 20th centuries as well as replicas made for Mossman's work with Pinewood and Elstree firm studios in the latter part of the 20th century.  

Unusual vehicles include an 18th-century landau and an early-19th-century barouche, both in very good condition. There is also an 1890s 'char-a-bang' which dates from the early days of public transportation.

See also

History of Luton
Stockwood Discovery Centre
Wardown Park Museum

References

Buildings and structures in Luton
Horse driving
Museums in Bedfordshire
Carriage museums in England
Transport museums in England
Culture in Luton